The 2012 Scottish Women's Cup is the national cup competition in Scottish women's football. All teams in the Scottish Women's Football League and Premier League are eligible to enter. Thurso based Caithness Ladies who do not play in league competition also take part for the first time. The tournament is known as the Henson Scottish Cup after a sponsorship arrangement.

Calendar

Preliminary round
The draw for the preliminary and first rounds took place at Hampden Park on 3 March 2012.

First round

Second round
The second round draw took place at Dens Park, Dundee on 23 May 2012.

Third round
The third round draw took place at Hampden Park on 14 June 2012.

Quarter-finals
The draw for the quarter finals took place on the Clyde 1 Superscoreboard programme on 28 August 2012. Celtic were expelled from the competition as they were unable to field a side against Glasgow City. The club had previously requested to reschedule the fixture but this was rejected by SWF.

Semifinals

Final

References

External links
 Scottish Women's Football

Cup
Scottish Women's Cup, 2012
Scottish Women's Cup